Faruq Z. Bey (born Jesse Davis; February 4, 1942 – June 1, 2012) was an American jazz saxophonist and composer from Detroit, Michigan. Bey was known for his work with Griot Galaxy, which played distinct compositions, often by Bey. Odd meters and polyrhythms were a frequent feature of the group's tunes, which would give way to free sections. Originally started in 1972, Griot Galaxy settled into its most stable line-up around 1980, when Bey was joined by saxophonists David McMurray and Anthony Holland, as well as bassist Jaribu Shahid and drummer Tani Tabbal. Griot Galaxy played at the 1983 Detroit Montreux Jazz Festival (now the Detroit Jazz Festival), and toured Europe in the mid-1980s.

In the mid-1980s Bey was in a serious motorcycle accident that left him in a coma. Almost a decade passed before he returned to performing. He re-emerged with an all woodwind ensemble called The Conspiracy Winds Ensemble. He began to play in Speaking in Tongues and Hakim Jami's Street Band. He joined forces with The Northwoods Improvisers, who devoted several releases to Bey's music. His frequent collaborators, saxophonists Michael Carey and Skeeter Shelton, joined him on most of the Northwoods Improviser's recordings. He also played in Kindred, a quartet with Kennith Green, Kevin Callaway and Joel Peterson, and in Odu Afrobeat Orchestra. Among Bey's last ensembles was The Absolute Tonalist Society with Carey, Peterson and drummer Kurt Prisbe.

Some of his most noted releases are Kins, Opus Krampus and Live at the DIA with Griot Galaxy, and Auzar and Ashirai Pattern with The Northwoods Improvisers.  Bey published two books of poetry, Year of the Iron Sheep and Etudes in Wanton Nesses, in addition to a theoretical/aesthetic manifesto Toward a "Ratio"nal Aesthetic (1989).  Bey died on June 1, 2012.  He had experienced long-term health issues including emphysema.

Discography
With Griot Galaxy
Kins (Black & White, 1982)
Live at the D.I.A. (Entropy Stereo, 1983)
The Montreux/Detroit Collection- Volume Three: Motor City Modernists (1983)
Opus Krampus (Sound Aspects, 1985)
With Northwoods Improvisers
19 Moons (Entropy Stereo, 2001)
Ashirai Pattern (Entropy Stereo, 2002)
Auzar (Entropy Stereo, 2004)
Journey Into The Valley (Entropy Stereo, 2004)
Hymn for Tomasz Stanko (Qbico, 2005)
Rwanda (Qbico, 2005)
Infa'a (Qbico, 2006)
Emerging Field (Entropy Stereo, 2009)
Primal Waters (Sagittarius A-Star, 2011)
With His Name Is Alive
Detrola (Track 8 Only) (Silver Mountain, 2006)
Silver Dragon (Silver Mountain, 2010)
With Synchron
Synchron (Sagittarius A-Star, 2012)
With Faruq Z. Bey 4et
Live at the Detroit Art Space (Sagittarius A-Star, 2012)
Faruq's Poetry
Hymn Book of the Anciency (Entropy/Codex, 2006)
With Phil Ranelin
Vibes From The Tribe (Tribe, 1975)
With Leroy Jenkins
Beneath Detroit: The Creative Arts Collective Concerts at The Detroit Institute Of Arts 1979-92 (Geodesic)
With M.L. Liebler
 The Kurl of the Butterfly's Tongue (Detroit Radio Company, 2008)
Gasoline: The Detroit Legacy Sessions (Detroit Radio Company, 2009)
With K.A.S. Serenity
Return to Rainbow Bridge (POPP, 1996)
With Dr. Prof. Leonard King
Later Then Is Latter Now (Uuquipleu, 2019)
 With Keith Vreeland
Bad Dog (2010)

References

External links
 Faruq Z. Bey on Detroit JazzStage
 

Musicians from Detroit
African-American woodwind musicians
American jazz composers
American male jazz composers
American jazz saxophonists
American male saxophonists
Respiratory disease deaths in Michigan
Deaths from emphysema
African-American jazz musicians
Jazz musicians from Michigan
1942 births
2012 deaths
20th-century African-American people
21st-century African-American people
20th-century American saxophonists